Cnidoscolus is a plant genus of the family Euphorbiaceae first described as a genus in 1827. The group is widespread across much of North and South America, including the West Indies.

The name is derived from the Greek words κνίδη (knide), meaning "nettle," and σκόλοψ (skolops), meaning "thorn" or "prickle."

Species

formerly included
moved to Astraea Jatropha

 C. obtusifolius - Jatropha mutabilis
 C. surinamensis - Astraea lobata

References

External links

 
Euphorbiaceae genera